The Women's giant slalom competition of the Albertville 1992 Olympics was held at Meribel.

The defending world champion was Pernilla Wiberg of Sweden, while Switzerland's Vreni Schneider was the defending World Cup giant slalom champion and France's Carole Merle led the 1992 World Cup.

Results

References 

Women's giant slalom
Alp
Olymp